Castellet-en-Luberon (before 2018: Castellet) is a commune in the Vaucluse department in the Provence-Alpes-Côte d'Azur region in southeastern France.

Geography
The river Calavon forms all of the commune's northern border.

See also
 Côtes du Luberon AOC
Communes of the Vaucluse department

References

Communes of Vaucluse